, whose name is often romanized Chin Kenichi, was a Japanese chef best known for his role as the Iron Chef Chinese on the television series Iron Chef (料理の鉄人). Nicknamed The Szechuan Sage, he wore a yellow outfit and rose into Kitchen Stadium holding a large Chinese chef's knife in his hand. He was the only Iron Chef to have held his position throughout the life of the show.

Background 
Chen was the son of Chen Kenmin (陈建民), who is regarded as the father of Sichuan cuisine (四川料理) in Japan. Chen's special dish, "prawns in chili Sauce" (Ebi Chili) (干烧明虾), was an adaptation of a dish that his father had introduced to Japan. As a result, Chen was often compared to his father on the series, with some saying that Iron Chef helped the son exceed the skills of his father.

Iron Chef 
Chen originally accepted his position on Iron Chef out of the need for a challenge, although the format of the show intrigued him. Even though he was the longest-serving Iron Chef and the only original Iron Chef, having been an Iron Chef for the series' six-year run, Chen had on several occasions considered leaving his position; among his reasons was the desire to tend to his restaurants, which had become booked every night since the show's start, as well as a bout of depression following the death of his mother. Ultimately, it was fellow Iron Chef Hiroyuki Sakai who convinced Chen to stay, with their agreement that should one leave the show, so would the other.

Because of his long tenure, Chen fought more battles than any of the other Iron Chefs, at 92
battles. He won 67, lost 22, and tied 3. He also enjoyed a run of 14 consecutive victories, the longest of any Iron Chef. His most memorable dish was chili prawns.

Despite his excellent record on the show, Chen often appeared endearingly surprised and relieved at victory. Arguably, his win over Japanese-Italian-French "fusion"-style chef Juinichi Itoh in the yogurt battle exemplifies this. He was also remarkable for his frequent tasting of food, frequently dipping his ladle into steaming concoctions for sampling, only to place the same ladle back in the food. The commentators to the show referred to this practice in humor as Chen's "eating".

Memorable matches 
Among his more memorable matches was one with challenger Dominique Corby of the Tour d'Argent, where, after the main battle (with foie gras as the theme ingredient) was fought to a tie, the overtime battle (with asparagus as the theme) also resulted in a tie—the only time that such an outcome occurred in the series. Rather than have Chen and Corby fight a second overtime battle, Chairman Kaga, the show's host decreed that both contestants were the winners, effectively calling the battle a draw.

As with other Iron Chefs, Chen "feuded" with a faction determined to take him down. In his case, he battled with the chefs of Heichinrou restaurant in Yokohama, defeating two of their numbers before finally losing to their head chef in an overtime battle.

Takashi Saito (not to be confused with the baseball player), top apprentice of Chen Kenmin and coach of Chen Kenichi. Chen beat his tutor in a prawn battle. Saito re-created Kenmin's original prawns in chili sauce, while Kenichi created his father's modern version of the dish (canapé style with ketchup).
Junichi Itoh had one of the most interesting cooking styles in the world. He began practicing French cooking at age 18 and left for France at age 28 to further his skills. However, he left for Italy three years later and joined Enoteca Pincchiori, the same place Masahiko Kobe was trained. At age 32, he began training at a top Japanese restaurant to learn Japanese-style cuisine. When he was 35, he opened his restaurant L'Herlequin Bis in Tokyo. His French-Italian-Japanese fusion style cooking led Takeshi Kaga to ask him to be a challenger. Itoh accepted and went to Kitchen Stadium with Asako Kishi. To everyone's surprise, he chose Chen Kenichi as the opponent, saying he is interested in Chinese cuisine, but had never been trained at it. Kaga chose a difficult theme ingredient, plain yoghurt. Itoh was smiling while Chen was under great pressure. However, according to Kishi's comments at the end, all of Itoh's dishes used the yoghurt as a supporting ingredient instead of the main focus of the dish. This resulted in all four judges voting for Chen. This was quite a surprise to Chen, who pointed to himself in disbelief.
Katsuyo Kobayashi was the show's second female challenger and a popular TV chef in her own right, hosting Kyo no ryori (Today's cooking) on NHK. She allowed Chairman Kaga to choose the Iron Chef for her and he gleefully chose Chen, who had previously lost to Kitchen Stadium's first female challenger, Kyoko Kagata. At one point during the battle, in which potatoes were the theme ingredient, Kobayashi paid a brief visit to Chen's station to observe his cooking, which he wasn't very pleased about. Chen ultimately lost to Kobayashi, with the judges commenting that his potatoes tended to be undercooked or underplayed.

Outside Iron Chef
Chen was an avid baseball fan and stated that it would have been his choice to go professional but opted not to.

Outside of Iron Chef, Chen also ran the Shisen Hanten (四川飯店, lit. "Sichuan restaurant") group of restaurants located in Akasaka, Ikebukuro and Roppongi in Tokyo, as well as Tokushima city in Tokushima Prefecture; Kure, Hiroshima; Matsuyama, Ehime; and Hakata-ku, Fukuoka. The restaurant was inherited from his father and he was the third to run it after his mother took over.

The branch in Singapore, operated by his son , has earned two Michelin stars since 2016. It is located in the newly renovated 1000+ room  Hilton Singapore hotel, the largest in the Asia Pacific.

Death 
According to Minken Kigyo, the company Chen established and was the former CEO, Chen died of interstitial lung disease on 11 March 2023, at age 67.

References

See also 
 Chinese people in Japan

External links
Iron Chef Battle Database (in English)
Szechwan Restaurant in Japanese

1956 births
2023 deaths
Japanese chefs
Japanese people of Chinese descent
People from Tokyo
Sichuan cuisine
Tamagawa University alumni